The Great Gilly Hopkins is a 2015 American comedy-drama film directed by Stephen Herek and written by David L. Paterson. It is based on Katherine Paterson's 1978 children's book of the same name. The film stars Sophie Nélisse, Kathy Bates, Julia Stiles, Bill Cobbs, Billy Magnussen, Octavia Spencer, and Glenn Close. The film was released on October 7, 2016, by Lionsgate Premiere.

Plot

Gilly Hopkins is the meanest girl in town: she has a birth mother she has never seen and has moved from one foster home to another. Learning that she will be sent to a new home, she wastes no time stirring up trouble. Then she meets a woman named Trotter, who wants to be the mother Gilly needs. With Gilly posing a challenge, Trotter must prove a good relationship will benefit both of them.

Cast
 Sophie Nélisse as Galadriel ”Gilly” Hopkins		
 Kathy Bates as Maime Trotter
 Julia Stiles as Courtney Rutherford Hopkins
 Zachary Hernandez as W.E. (William Ernest)
 Bill Cobbs as Mr. Randolph
 Billy Magnussen as	Ellis
 Octavia Spencer as Miss Harris
 Glenn Close as Nonnie Hopkins
 Clare Foley as Agnes
 Sammy Pignalosa as Rajeem
 Toby Turner as Ticket Agent
 Frank Oz as Cookie Monster (voice)

Production
On February 8, 2013, it was announced that Stephen Herek would direct an adaption of The Great Gilly Hopkins, with Kathy Bates and Danny Glover set to star in the film. On February 6, 2014, Sophie Nélisse, Glenn Close and Octavia Spencer joined the cast of the film. On May 9, 2014, Julia Stiles and Bill Cobbs joined the cast of the film. Cobbs replaced Glover, who dropped out due to scheduling conflicts. Principal photography began on April 9, 2014, and ended on June 15, 2014.

Release
The film premiered on October 6, 2015, at the SCHLINGEL International Film Festival. Lionsgate Premiere acquired distribution rights, and set the film for an October 7, 2016, release.

References

External links
 
 

2015 films
American comedy-drama films
2015 comedy-drama films
Films directed by Stephen Herek
Films scored by Mark Isham
Lionsgate films
Films based on American novels
2010s English-language films
2010s American films